Nartovsky is a rural locality (a settlement) in Yaksatovsky Selsoviet, Privolzhsky District, Astrakhan Oblast, Russia. The population was 424 as of 2010. There are 5 streets.

Geography 
It is located on the Kizan River, 38 km southwest of Nachalovo (the district's administrative centre) by road. Atal is the nearest rural locality.

References 

Rural localities in Privolzhsky District, Astrakhan Oblast